Fucoli-Somepal (full name: Fucoli-Somepal, Fundição de Ferro, S.A.) is an iron foundry company headquartered in Coimbra, Portugal. The company has its industrial facilities in two locations: Coimbra (in Coselhas), and Mealhada (in the civil parish of Pampilhosa).

History
The company had its origins in the 1940s, being today a result of a merging process of Fucoli and Somepal foundries in 1998. It started its international activities in 1990. Currently, it is among the largest iron casting producers and exporters of Portugal.

External links
Official site

Metal companies of Portugal
Organisations based in Coimbra